Leslie-Ann Gervais (born August 29, 1977) is a Canadian former professional fencer who specialized in the épée. She won a team silver in the 2008 Pan American Fencing Championships.

References

Canadian female épée fencers
Living people
1977 births
Place of birth missing (living people)
21st-century Canadian women